La Ferté-Saint-Cyr is a commune near Blois, in the Loir-et-Cher department in Centre-Val de Loire, France.

Geography
The commune is traversed by the Cosson river.

Population

See also
Communes of the Loir-et-Cher department

References

Communes of Loir-et-Cher